This page lists all described species of the spider family Psechridae accepted by the World Spider Catalog :

Fecenia

Fecenia Simon, 1887
 F. cylindrata Thorell, 1895 — China, Myanmar, Thailand, Laos
 F. macilenta (Simon, 1885) — Malaysia, Indonesia (Sumatra)
 F. ochracea (Doleschall, 1859) (type) — Philippines to Australia (Queensland)
 F. protensa Thorell, 1891 — India (mainland, Nicobar Is.), Sri Lanka, Thailand, Vietnam, Malaysia, Singapore, Brunei, Indonesia (Sumatra, Borneo, Bali)

Psechrus

Psechrus Thorell, 1878
 P. aluco Bayer, 2012 — Indonesia (Java)
 P. ampullaceus Bayer, 2014 — Vietnam
 P. ancoralis Bayer & Jäger, 2010 — Laos, Thailand
 P. annulatus Kulczyński, 1908 — Indonesia (Java)
 P. antraeus Bayer & Jäger, 2010 — Laos
 P. arcuatus Bayer, 2012 — Indonesia (Sumatra)
 P. argentatus (Doleschall, 1857) (type) — Indonesia (Sulawesi) to Australia (Queensland)
 P. arietinus Bayer, 2014 — Vietnam
 P. borneo Levi, 1982 — Borneo
 P. cebu Murphy, 1986 — Philippines
 P. changminae Feng, Zhang, Wu, Ma, T. B. Yang, Li & Z. Z. Yang, 2016 — China
 P. clavis Bayer, 2012 — Taiwan
 P. conicus Feng, Zhang, Wu, Ma, T. B. Yang, Li & Z. Z. Yang, 2016 — China
 P. crepido Bayer, 2012 — India
 P. decollatus Bayer, 2012 — Indonesia (Java)
 P. demiror Bayer, 2012 — Vietnam, Cambodia, and/or Laos
 P. discoideus Feng, Zhang, Wu, Ma, T. B. Yang, Li & Z. Z. Yang, 2016 — China
 P. elachys Bayer, 2012 — Thailand
 P. fuscai Bayer, 2012 — China
 P. ghecuanus Thorell, 1897 — Myanmar, Thailand, Laos, China
 P. hartmanni Bayer, 2012 — Sri Lanka
 P. himalayanus Simon, 1906 — India, Nepal, Bhutan
 P. huberi Bayer, 2014 — Philippines
 P. inflatus Bayer, 2012 — India, China
 P. insulanus Bayer, 2014 — Thailand
 P. jaegeri Bayer, 2012 — Thailand, Laos
 P. jinggangensis Wang & Yin, 2001 — China
 P. kenting Yoshida, 2009 — Taiwan
 P. khammouan Jäger, 2007 — Laos
 P. kinabalu Levi, 1982 — Borneo
 P. kunmingensis Yin, Wang & Zhang, 1985 — China
 P. laos Bayer, 2012 — Laos
 P. libelti Kulczyński, 1908 — Thailand to Indonesia (Borneo)
 P. luangprabang Jäger, 2007 — Laos
 P. marsyandi Levi, 1982 — Nepal
 P. mulu Levi, 1982 — Borneo
 P. norops Bayer, 2012 — Malaysia
 P. obtectus Bayer, 2012 — Vietnam
 P. omistes Bayer, 2014 — Indonesia (Sumatra)
 P. pakawini Bayer, 2012 — Myanmar, Thailand
 P. quasillus Bayer, 2014 — Borneo
 P. rani Wang & Yin, 2001 — China, Vietnam
 P. schwendingeri Bayer, 2012 — Philippines
 P. senoculatus Yin, Wang & Zhang, 1985 — China
 P. sinensis Berland & Berland, 1914 — China
 P. singaporensis Thorell, 1894 — Malaysia, Singapore, Indonesia (Sumatra)
 P. spatulatus Feng, Zhang, Wu, Ma, T. B. Yang, Li & Z. Z. Yang, 2016 — China
 P. steineri Bayer & Jäger, 2010 — Laos
 P. taiwanensis Wang & Yin, 2001 — Taiwan
 P. tauricornis Bayer, 2012 — Sri Lanka
 P. tingpingensis Yin, Wang & Zhang, 1985 — China
 P. torvus (O. Pickard-Cambridge, 1869) — Sri Lanka, India
 P. triangulus Yang, Zhang, Zhu & Song, 2003 — China
 P. ulcus Bayer, 2012 — Borneo
 P. vivax Bayer, 2012 — Thailand
 P. wade Bayer, 2014 — Philippines
 P. zygon Bayer, 2012 — Sri Lanka

References

Psechridae